The year 1998 is the 6th year in the history of the Ultimate Fighting Championship (UFC), a mixed martial arts promotion based in the United States. In 1998 the UFC held 3 events beginning with, UFC 16: Battle in the Bayou.

Title fights

Debut UFC fighters

The following fighters fought their first UFC fight in 1998:

Adriano Santos
Allan Goes
Andre Roberts
Bob Gilstrap
Carlos Newton
Cesar Marscucci
Chris Brennan
Chuck Liddell
Courtney Turner
Dan Henderson

Ebenezer Fontes Braga
Eugenio Tadeu
Hugo Duarte
Igor Zinoviev
Jeremy Horn
Joe Pardo
John Lober
Josh Stuart
Laverne Clark
Mike Van Arsdale

Mikey Burnett
Noe Hernandez
Pat Miletich
Paulo Santos
Pedro Rizzo
Pete Williams
Townsend Saunders
Tsuyoshi Kosaka
Tulio Palhares
Wanderlei Silva

Events list

See also
 UFC
 List of UFC champions
 List of UFC events

References

Ultimate Fighting Championship by year
1998 in mixed martial arts